Farid Ahmad was a Bengali Pakistani politician, lawyer, and vice-president of Pakistan Democratic Party.

Early life
Ahmad was born on 3 January 1923 in Rashid Nagar, Ramu Upazila, Cox's Bazar District, East Bengal, British Raj. He completed his Matriculation from Cox's Bazar Government High School. He finished his I.A. from Chittagong Government College. In 1945 he graduated with B.A. in English language from the University of Dhaka. He completed his M.A. from the University of Dhaka in 1946. In 1947 he completed his LLB degree.

Career
Ahmad was elected vice-president of Dhaka University Central Student Union. In 1952 he joined the Nizam-e-Islam Party. In 1954 he was elected to the East Bengal Provincial Assembly and in 1955 he was elected to the Pakistan Constituent Assembly. From 1954 to 1969 he was the general secretary of the Nizam-e-Islam Party. He served as the chief whip of the East Bengal Provincial Assembly. He served in the cabinet of Ismail Ibrahim Chundrigar as the Minister of Labour. In 1962 he was elected to the National Assembly of Pakistan. He served as the chairman of Public Accounts Committee in the National Assembly till 1965. In 1964 he was elected chairman of Combined Opposition Party in East Pakistan. He was reelected to the Pakistan National Assembly in 1965.

In 1965 Ahmad wrote a book on Muhammad Ali, titled Muhammad Ali Clay. He was the advisory editor of Prithibi, a monthly magazine. In 1967, he joined the Pakistan Democratic Movement and campaigned against President Ayub Khan. During February 1969 to March 1969 he attended the Round Table Conference by Ayub Khan as the representative of the Nizam-e-Islam Party. He was elected the vice-president of Pakistan Democratic Party in 1969. In 1971 he represented Pakistan at the Afro-Asian People's Solidarity Organisation in Damascus, Syria. He served as the managing editor of The Daily Najat.  He lost his seat in the 1970 General Election of Pakistan. He supported Pakistan during Bangladesh Liberation war. On 10 April 1971, he helped form the East Pakistan Central Peace Committee in Dhaka and was a founding member of the committee. He served as the president of East Pakistan Peace and Welfare Council. He was an adviser to the paramilitary Razakar Bahini.

Death
Ahmad was killed on 23 December 1971, after the independence of Bangladesh, by Mukti Bahini members.

References

1923 births
1971 deaths
People from Cox's Bazar District
Federal ministers of Pakistan
Chittagong College alumni
University of Dhaka alumni
Nizam-e-Islam Party politicians
Pakistani MNAs 1955–1958
Pakistani MNAs 1962–1965
Pakistani MNAs 1965–1969